Genovaitė Ramoškienė (née Šidagytė on 12 May 1945) is a retired Lithuanian rower. She won a bronze medal at the 1976 Summer Olympics in the double sculls event, together with Eleonora Kaminskaitė. Individually, she won two gold, one silver and three bronze medals in the single sculls at the European and world championships of 1967–1975.

After graduating from the Lithuanian Sports University in 1966 Ramoškienė worked as a lecturer of physical education.

References

1945 births
Living people
Lithuanian female rowers
Soviet female rowers
Olympic rowers of the Soviet Union
Rowers at the 1976 Summer Olympics
Olympic bronze medalists for the Soviet Union
Olympic medalists in rowing
World Rowing Championships medalists for the Soviet Union
Medalists at the 1976 Summer Olympics
European Rowing Championships medalists